A starship, starcraft, or interstellar spacecraft is a theoretical spacecraft designed for traveling between planetary systems.

The term is mostly found in science fiction. Reference to a "star-ship" appears as early as 1882 in Oahspe: A New Bible.

While NASA's Voyager and Pioneer probes have traveled into local interstellar space, the purpose of these uncrewed craft was specifically interplanetary, and they are not predicted to reach another star system (although Voyager 1 will travel to within 1.7 light years of Gliese 445 in approximately 40,000 years). Several preliminary designs for starships have been undertaken through exploratory engineering, using feasibility studies with modern technology or technology thought likely to be available in the near future.

In April 2016, scientists announced Breakthrough Starshot, a Breakthrough Initiatives program, to develop a proof-of-concept fleet of small centimeter-sized light sail spacecraft named StarChip, capable of making the journey to Alpha Centauri, the nearest star system, at speeds of 20% and 15% of the speed of light, taking between 20 and 30 years to reach the star system, respectively, and about 4 years to notify Earth of a successful arrival.

Research

To travel between stars in a reasonable time using rocket-like technology requires very high effective exhaust velocity jet and enormous energy to power this, such as might be provided by fusion power or antimatter.

There are very few scientific studies that investigate the issues in building a starship. Some examples of this include:

Project Orion (1958–1965), mostly crewed interplanetary spacecraft
Project Daedalus (1973–1978), uncrewed interstellar probe
Project Longshot (1987–1988), uncrewed interstellar probe
Project Icarus (2009–2014), uncrewed interstellar probe
Hundred-Year Starship (2011), crewed interstellar craft

The Bussard ramjet is an idea to use nuclear fusion of interstellar gas to provide propulsion.

Examined in an October 1973 issue of Analog, the Enzmann Starship proposed using a 12,000-ton ball of frozen deuterium to power pulse propulsion units. Twice as long as the Empire State Building is tall and assembled in-orbit, the proposed spacecraft would be part of a larger project preceded by interstellar probes and telescopic observation of target star systems.

The NASA Breakthrough Propulsion Physics Program (1996–2002) was a professional scientific study examining advanced spacecraft propulsion systems.

Fictional types
A common science-fiction device is to posit a faster-than-light propulsion system (such as warp drive) or travel through hyperspace, although some posit starships as outfitted for centuries-long journeys of slower-than-light travel. Other designs posit a way to boost the ship to near-lightspeed, allowing relatively "quick" travel (i.e. decades, not centuries) to nearer stars. This results in a general categorization of the kinds of starships:

 Sleeper, which put their passengers into stasis during a long trip. This includes cryonics-based systems that freeze passengers for the duration of the journey.
 Generation, in which the destination would be reached by descendants of the original passengers.
 Relativistic, taking advantage of time dilation at close-to-light-speeds, so long trips will seem much shorter (but still take the same amount of time for outside observers).
 Faster-than-light (FTL), reaching a destination faster than the speed of light (using inter-dimensional shortcuts or wormholes). According to the theory of relativity, faster-than-light travel is impossible.

Theoretical possibilities
The Alcubierre drive is a speculative warp drive conjectured by Mexican physicist Miguel Alcubierre in a 1994 paper which has not been peer-reviewed. The paper suggests that space itself could be topographically warped to create a local region of spacetime wherein the region ahead of the "warp bubble" is compressed, allowed to resume normalcy within the bubble, and then rapidly expanded behind the bubble creating an effect that results in apparent FTL travel, all in a manner consistent with the Einstein field equations of general relativity and without the introduction of wormholes. However, the actual construction of such a drive would face other serious theoretical difficulties.

Fictional examples

There are widely known vessels in various science fiction franchises. The most prominent cultural use and one of the earliest common uses of the term starship was in Star Trek: The Original Series.

Individual ships

(This list is not exhaustive.)
 Battlestar Galactica (Battlestar Galactica)
 High Charity (Halo Series)
 Hyperion (StarCraft)
 Jupiter 2 (Lost In Space)
 Long Shot (Ringworld)
 Moya (Farscape)
 NSEA Protector (Galaxy Quest)
 SDF-1 Macross (The Super Dimension Fortress Macross)
 SSV Normandy (Mass Effect)
 UNSC Infinity (Halo Series)
 USG Ishimura (Dead Space)
 Yamato (Space Battleship Yamato/Star Blazers)

Groups of ships
 Spacecraft in Star Trek
 USS Defiant (Star Trek: Deep Space Nine)
 USS Discovery
 USS Enterprise (various)
 USS Voyager (Star Trek: Voyager)
 Klingon starships
 Star Wars starships
 Millennium Falcon
 Star Destroyers
The Reapers (Mass Effect)

See also

References

External links
 
 Starship Dimensions (to-scale size comparisons)
 Starship Size Comparison Chart 1 (Dan Carlson, 13 July 2003)
 Starship Size Comparison Chart 2 (Dan Carlson, 30 October 2003)
 Starship Names (a Sci-Fi wiki article, outside Wikipedia)

Fictional spacecraft by type
Science fiction themes
Spaceflight
Fiction about transport
Interstellar travel

es:Astronave